Paul Maas (18 November 1880, in Frankfurt am Main15 July 1964, in Oxford) was a German scholar who, along with Karl Lachmann,  founded the field of textual criticism.

He studied classical philology at the universities of Berlin and Munich, receiving his doctorate in 1903. In 1910 he obtained his habilitation and in 1920 became a full professor at Berlin. In 1930 he was appointed chair of classical philology at the University of Königsberg. In 1934 he was forced into retirement by the Nazi government, and in 1939 he emigrated to Great Britain, where he taught classes at Oxford University. After his death, he was buried at Wolvercote Cemetery's Jewish section in Oxford.

Maas's law 
Maas formulated Maas's law, an observation of the layout of bookrolls.

Works by Maas published in English 
 Textual criticism (1958), translation of Textkritik, 1927.
 Greek metre (1962), translation of Griechische metrik, 1923.

Literature 
 Katja Bär: Paul Maas. In: Robert B. Todd (Hrsg.): Dictionary of British Classicists Vol. 2. Bristol 2004.
 Charles Oscar Brink: Paul Maas (1880–1964). In: Eikasmós 4, 1993, S. 253–254. (Abstract)
 Richard Kannicht: Griechische Metrik. In: Heinz-Günther Nesselrath (Hrsg.): Einleitung in die griechische Philologie. B. G. Teubner, Stuttgart/Leipzig 1997, S. 343–362.
 Hugh Lloyd-Jones: Paul Maas †. In: Gnomon 37, 1965, S. 219–221.
 Hugh Lloyd-Jones: Paul Maas (1880–1964). In: Eikasmós 4, 1993, S. 255–262. (Abstract)
 Eckart Mensching: Über einen verfolgten deutschen Altphilologen: Paul Maas 1880–1964. Berlin 1987.

References 

1880 births
1964 deaths
German classical scholars
Jewish emigrants from Nazi Germany to the United Kingdom
Academic staff of the University of Königsberg
Academic staff of the Humboldt University of Berlin
Textual criticism
Members of the German Academy of Sciences at Berlin
Corresponding Fellows of the British Academy
Burials at Wolvercote Cemetery